Hüblingen is an Ortsgemeinde – a community belonging to a Verbandsgemeinde – in the Westerwaldkreis in Rhineland-Palatinate, Germany.

Geography

The community lies in the Westerwald between the towns of Siegen (36 km to the north), Wetzlar (29 km to the east) and Limburg an der Lahn (20 km to the south). Hüblingen belongs to the Verbandsgemeinde of Rennerod, a kind of collective municipality.

Politics

The municipal council is made up of 6 council members who were elected in a majority vote in a municipal election on 13 June 2004.

Economy and infrastructure

West of the community runs Bundesstraße 54, leading from Limburg an der Lahn to Siegen. The nearest Autobahn interchange is Limburg-Nord on the A 3 (Cologne–Frankfurt), some 22 km away. The nearest InterCityExpress stop is the railway station at Limburg an der Lahn on the Cologne-Frankfurt high-speed rail line.

References

External links
Hüblingen in the collective municipality’s Web pages 

Municipalities in Rhineland-Palatinate
Westerwaldkreis